Acacia pruinosa, commonly known as the frosty wattle, is a species of Acacia native to eastern Australia.

Description
The spherical flower-heads with a diameter of  contain 40 to 60 yellow to bright yellow flowers.

The type specimen was collected by the botanist Alan Cunningham in 1827 on the Liverpool Plains of New South Wales.

Distribution
It is found in northeastern New South Wales from around Uralla in the south stretching north into southeastern Queensland. It is often a part of dry sclerophyll forest and woodland communities and grows in sandy and skeletal soils over and around granite.

See also
 List of Acacia species

References

pruinosa
Fabales of Australia
Flora of New South Wales
Flora of Queensland
Plants described in 1842
Taxa named by George Bentham